Segrdkan is a village and subdistrict in Erbil Governorate in the Kurdistan Region, Iraq. It is located in Koy Sinjaq District.

References

Populated places in Erbil Governorate
Subdistricts of Iraq